Guy Bricout (born 18 February 1944) is a French politician representing the Union of Democrats and Independents. He was elected to the French National Assembly on 18 June 2017, representing the department of Nord.

Bricout entered politics in 1971 when he became councilor for the Caudry commune. He was then elected mayor of Caudry in 1995 as part of the Miscellaneous right, a position he would hold until his election as parliamentarian in 2017. Bricout has one son named Frédéric who is a councilor for Caudry. His other son Olivier died in 2012 at the age of 47.

References

1944 births
Living people
Deputies of the 15th National Assembly of the French Fifth Republic
Union of Democrats and Independents politicians
Politicians from Hauts-de-France
People from Nord (French department)
Deputies of the 16th National Assembly of the French Fifth Republic
Members of Parliament for Nord
Mayors of places in Hauts-de-France